Matteo Richetti (born 3 August 1974) is an Italian politician, a member of the Italian Chamber of Deputies and former spokesman of the Democratic Party.

Biography
Matteo Richetti was born in Sassuolo, Modena in 1974. He started his interest in politics when he attended the lyceum.

In 2003 he became a member of the Christian leftist The Daisy party; in 2007 he joined the Democratic Party.

During 2010s he became a close advisor of Matteo Renzi, former Mayor of Florence and Prime Minister of Italy from 2014 to 2016. In 2017 Renzi appointed Richetti spokesman of the Democratic Party.

On 8 April 2018, Richetti launched his reformist faction Harambee and announced his intention to run as next secretary of the Democratic Party.

On 10 September 2019, Richetti announced his abstention regarding the investiture vote of the new government between PD and the Five Star Movement, and his subsequent exit from the party. On the same day, he stated that he would join Carlo Calenda's movement, Action.

References

1974 births
Living people
People from Sassuolo
Democracy is Freedom – The Daisy politicians
Democratic Party (Italy) politicians
Deputies of Legislature XVII of Italy
Senators of Legislature XVIII of Italy
Politicians of Emilia-Romagna